Andrée Poulin (born July 29, 1960) is a Canadian writer.

She was born in Orleans, Ontario, now part of Ottawa. She worked as a journalist before becoming a full-time writer. Poulin now lives in Gatineau, Quebec.

She has been awarded the literary prize offered by Le Droit in the youth literature category four times. Her books were finalists for Hackmatack Book Awards in 2005, 2006 and 2011.

Selected work 
 Ping contre Tête-de-Navet (2003)
 Le meilleur moment (2007) illustrated by Philippe Beha
 Où sont passés les zippopos? (2009)
 Mon papa ne pue pas (2009) illustrated by Jean Morin, received the Prize awarded by the customers of the Réseau des bibliothèques de la Ville de Québec
 Miss Pissenlit (2010), received the 
 À la découverte de l'Ontario français : abécédaire (2012)
 La plus grosse poutine du monde (2013), received the TD Canadian Children's Literature Award and the Prix Tamarac
 Pablo trouve un trésor (2014)
 Un bain trop plein (2014)
 Disparition sous le baobab (2015)
 Deux garçons et un secret (2016) illustrated by Marie Lafrance, was a finalist for the Governor General's Award for French-language children's illustration
 Une cachette pour les bobettes (2016), was a finalist for the Prix du livre jeunesse des bibliothèques de Montréal
 L'album jeunesse, un trésor à exploiter : concepts clés et activités pour maximiser le potentiel pédagogique des albums (2017)
 Y'a pas de place chez nous illustrated by Enzo Lord Mariano (2016)

References

External links 

 

1960 births
Living people
Canadian women children's writers
Canadian children's writers in French
Franco-Ontarian people
Writers from Ottawa
Writers from Gatineau